The Merry Vineyard is a 1952 West German comedy film directed by Erich Engel and starring Gustav Knuth, Camilla Spira and Wilfried Seyferth. It is based on a play by Carl Zuckmayer which had previously been made into a silent film in 1927. It was made at the Tempelhof Studios in West Berlin. The film's sets were designed by the art director Franz Schroedter. It is sometimes known by the alternative title of The Grapes Are Ripe.

Cast

References

Bibliography 
 Goble, Alan. The Complete Index to Literary Sources in Film. Walter de Gruyter, 1999.

External links 
 

1952 films
West German films
German comedy films
1952 comedy films
1950s German-language films
Films directed by Erich Engel
German films based on plays
Films based on works by Carl Zuckmayer
Remakes of German films
Sound film remakes of silent films
Films shot at Tempelhof Studios
1950s German films